Sanjeeva may refer to:

Sanjeeva Edirimanna, Sri Lankan politician, member of the Sri Lankan parliament
Sanjeeva Kaviratne (1969–2014), Sri Lankan politician, member of Parliament
Sanjeeva Nayaka, Indian lichenologist
Sanjeeva Ranatunga (born 1969), former Sri Lankan cricketer
G. Sanjeeva Reddy a politician, artist, ex-Member of the Parliament of India
Sangi Reddy Sanjeeva Reddy, a Non Commissioned Officer (NCO) in the Engineer Regiment of the Indian Army who posthumously received the Sena Medal, a prestigious gallantry award
Sanjeeva Kumar Singh, Indian archery coach from Jharkhand
Sanjeeva Uchil (died 2006), Indian Olympic football goalkeeper

See also
Sanjeeva Reddy Nagar, a residential area in Hyderabad, Telangana, India
Sanjeev
Sanjeevaiah (disambiguation)
Sanjeevani (disambiguation)
Sanjeevi
Sanjiv

Sinhalese masculine given names